The Communist Party of Uruguay (PCU) is a communist party in Uruguay, founded on 21 September 1920. It is a member of the Broad Front coalition.

The current secretary-general of the PCU is Juan Castillo.

Secretary-generals

References

External links

 
International Meeting of Communist and Workers Parties